Peter Čögley (born 11 August 1988) is Former Slovak football player.

In November 2022, Čögley joined his former manager Martin Ševela to serve as his assistant manager at Al Adalah of Saudi Professional League.

Career statistics

External links 
 AS Trenčín profile

References 

1988 births
Living people
Sportspeople from Trenčín
Slovak footballers
Association football defenders
AS Trenčín players
Bohemians 1905 players
FC Spartak Trnava players
FC ViOn Zlaté Moravce players
MFK Skalica players
Slovak Super Liga players
2. Liga (Slovakia) players
Czech First League players
Expatriate footballers in the Czech Republic
Slovak expatriate sportspeople in the Czech Republic
Slovak expatriate sportspeople in Saudi Arabia